This is the discography of Sigala, an English DJ, music producer and remixer. His debut studio album, Brighter Days, was released in September 2018. The album peaked at number fourteen on the UK Albums Chart. The album includes the singles "Easy Love", "Sweet Lovin'", "Say You Do", "Give Me Your Love", "Ain't Giving Up", "Came Here for Love", "Lullaby", "Feels Like Home", "We Don't Care" and "Just Got Paid".

Studio albums

Singles

As lead artist

As featured artist

Productions

Remixes

Notes

References

Discographies of British artists